Hot Country Songs is a chart that ranks the top-performing country music songs in the United States, published by Billboard magazine.  In 1960, five different songs topped the chart, which at the time was published under the title Hot C&W Sides, C&W being an abbreviation for country and western.  Chart placings were based on playlists submitted by country music radio stations and sales reports submitted by stores.

In the issue of Billboard dated January 4, the song at number one was "El Paso" by Marty Robbins, the track's third week in the top spot.  It held the peak position for the first five weeks of 1960, during which time it also topped the all-genre Hot 100 chart for two weeks.  During the remainder of the year, only four other songs reached the top of the Hot C&W Sides listing, three of which each spent twelve or more consecutive weeks at number one.  In the issue of Billboard dated February 8, Jim Reeves began a 14-week unbroken run at the top of the chart with "He'll Have to Go", which was immediately followed by a run of the same length by Hank Locklin's "Please Help Me, I'm Falling".  Both songs were produced by Chet Atkins, widely seen as the originator of the "Nashville Sound", a new style of country music which eschewed elements of the earlier honky-tonk style in favour of smooth productions which had a broader appeal.  Cowboy Copas next spent 12 weeks at number one with "Alabam". Several singles peaked at number two during these songs' extended runs at the top of the chart, including "One More Time" by Ray Price, which spent eight consecutive weeks in second place behind Locklin's song.

"Alabam" was the first chart-topping single for Copas and marked a comeback in his career, as prior to its success he had not entered the chart at all since 1952.  Nonetheless, it would be the only number one for the singer, who died in a plane crash in 1963.  "Please Help Me, I'm Falling" was Locklin's first number one since he topped the earlier Country and Western Most Played by Jockeys chart in January 1954, but like Copas he would not return to the top spot, even though he would remain an active recording artist into the 21st century.  The final country number one of 1960 was Ferlin Husky's "Wings of a Dove"; although he would continue to chart well into the 1970s, Husky would also not achieve another number one.  Marty Robbins, in contrast, would go on to achieve several more number ones, including 1976's "El Paso City", a sequel of sorts to his earlier song.

Chart history

See also
1960 in music
1960 in country music
List of artists who reached number one on the U.S. country chart

Notes and references
Notes
A.  The last issue of 1960 was dated December 31, only five days after the previous issue.  The next issue was dated January 9, 1961.

References

1960
Country
1960 record charts